Joël Camathias (born 9 February 1981) is a Swiss race car driver born in Lugano. In 2001 he raced in the International Formula 3000 championship and in 2002 in the European F3000 series. In 2003 he made 7 starts in the American Champ Car series for Dale Coyne Racing, his best finish a 9th in his debut at the Grand Prix of St. Petersburg. Having previously driven sports cars part-time, he then returned to Europe to drive in the Le Mans Series in 2004 and the FIA GT Championship in 2005 and 2006. He also won the GT2 Class of the 2006 Le Mans Series season with Marc Lieb driving a Porsche 911 for Autorlando Sport.

Joël is the great-nephew of the late Florian Camathias, a solo motorcycle and sidecar racer, and his father Romeo was a car racer.

Racing record

Complete International Formula 3000 results
(key) (Races in bold indicate pole position) (Races in italics indicate fastest lap)

Complete CART results
(key)

24 Hours of Le Mans results

References

External links
  (hybrid English-Italian)
 

1981 births
Living people
Swiss racing drivers
Champ Car drivers
FIA GT Championship drivers
Auto GP drivers
International Formula 3000 drivers
European Le Mans Series drivers
24 Hours of Le Mans drivers
FIA World Endurance Championship drivers
International GT Open drivers
24 Hours of Spa drivers
Sportspeople from Lugano

KCMG drivers
KTR drivers
Dale Coyne Racing drivers
Ombra Racing drivers
24H Series drivers
GT4 European Series drivers
Craft-Bamboo Racing drivers